Valentina Ivanovna Matviyenko (née Tyutina (Тютина;); born 7 April 1949) is a Russian politician and diplomat serving as a Senator from Saint Petersburg and the Chairwoman of the Federation Council since 2011. Previously she was Governor of Saint Petersburg from 2003 to 2011.

Born in Ukraine, Matviyenko began her political career in the 1980s in Leningrad (now Saint Petersburg), and was the First Secretary of the Krasnogvardeysky District Communist Party of the city from 1984 to 1986. In the 1990s, Matviyenko served as the Russian Ambassador to Malta (1991–1995), and to Greece (1997–1998). From 1998 to 2003, Matviyenko was Deputy Prime Minister for Welfare, and briefly the Presidential Envoy to the Northwestern Federal District in 2003. By that time, Matviyenko was firmly allied with Russian President Vladimir Putin, an alliance which secured her a victory in the gubernatorial elections in Saint Petersburg, Putin's native city.

Matviyenko became the first female leader of Saint Petersburg. Since the start of Matviyenko's service as governor, a significant share of taxation money was transferred from the federal budget to the local budget, and along with the booming economy and improving investment climate the standard of living significantly increased in the city, making income levels much closer to Moscow, and far above most other Russian federal subjects. The profile of Saint Petersburg in Russian politics has risen, marked by the transfer of the Constitutional Court of Russia from Moscow in 2008. Matviyenko developed a large number of megaprojects in housing and infrastructure, such as the construction of the Saint Petersburg Ring Road, including the Big Obukhovsky Bridge (the only non-draw bridge over the Neva River in the city), completion of the Saint Petersburg Dam aimed to put an end to the infamous Saint Petersburg floods, launching Line 5 of Saint Petersburg Metro, and starting land reclamation in the Neva Bay for the new Marine Facade of the city (the largest European waterfront development project) containing the Passenger Port of St. Petersburg. Several major auto-producing companies were drawn to Saint Petersburg or its vicinity, including Toyota, General Motors, Nissan, Hyundai Motor, Suzuki, Magna International, Scania, and MAN SE (all having plants in the Shushary industrial zone), thus turning the city into an important center of automotive industry in Russia, specializing in foreign brands. Another development of Matviyenko's governorship was tourism; by 2010 the number of tourists in Saint Petersburg doubled and reached 5.2 million, which placed the city among the top five tourist centers in Europe.

Some actions and practices of Governor Matviyenko have drawn significant criticisms from the Saint Petersburg public, the media, and opposition groups. In particular, new construction in already heavily built-up areas and several building projects were deemed to conflict with the classical architecture of the city, where the entire centre is a UNESCO World Heritage Site. Some projects eventually were cancelled or modified, such as the controversial design of a 400-metre-tall Okhta Center skyscraper, planned to be built adjacent to the historical center of the city; however, after a public campaign and the personal involvement of Russian President Dmitry Medvedev, it was relocated from Okhta to the Lakhta suburb. Another major point of criticism was Matviyenko's handling of the city's snow removal problems during the unusually cold and snowy winters of 2009–10 and 2010–11. On 22 August 2011, soon after completion of the Saint Petersburg Dam, Matviyenko resigned from office. As a member of the ruling United Russia Party, on 21 September 2011, Matviyenko was elected as Chairwoman of the Federation Council, the country's third-highest elected office.

Early life
Valentina Tyutina was born in Shepetivka in the Khmelnytskyi Oblast of Western Ukrainian SSR, Soviet Union. In 1972, Matviyenko graduated from Leningrad Institute of Chemistry and Pharmaceutics, where she met her husband, Vladimir Vasilyevich Matviyenko. They had a son, Sergey, in 1973. Matviyenko held various leadership positions within the Komsomol organization until 1984.

Early political career

Valentina Matviyenko graduated from the Communist Party of the Soviet Union's Academy in 1985 and became a party official in Leningrad's municipal government. In 1984–1986, she was the First Secretary of the Krasnogvardeysky District Committee of the Party.
Matviyenko was elected as a people's deputy to the Supreme Soviet of the Soviet Union and headed the committee on women, family and children affairs.

Between 1991 and 1998, Matviyenko served in the diplomatic service and held several diplomatic positions including posts of Russian ambassador to Malta (1991–1995) and Greece (1997–1998).
On 24 September 1998, Matviyenko was appointed Deputy Prime Minister of Russia for Welfare, and occupied this position until 2003.
In June 1999 she worked on the board of directors of the ORT TV channel.

Matvyenko was involved in a life-threatening car accident on 20 November 1999.

On 3 February 2000, she was nominated for the presidency, but refused to contest. On 29 February 2000, she announced that she was considering running in the St. Petersburg governor elections to be held on 14 May, and on 10 March announced that she was indeed launching her campaign. However, on 4 April she claimed that Vladimir Putin had asked her to withdraw from the elections, and she did so on 5 April.
On 11 March 2003, she left the Deputy PM position and was appointed presidential envoy to the Northwestern Federal District by Vladimir Putin.

Governor of Saint Petersburg

Election

On 24 June 2003, after Saint Petersburg governor Vladimir Yakovlev resigned ahead of schedule, Matviyenko announced that she was ready to run for governor. Her nomination was supported by the United Russia political party and President Vladimir Putin. Putin publicly supported her candidacy on 2 September in a meeting that was broadcast by two state-owned TV stations. Previously, at the end of June, the new management of local channel St. Petersburg Television shut down a range of analytical programmes on local politics, which was thought to be one of the factors in elections outcome.

In the first round of elections held on 21 September 2003, Matviyenko came first with 48.61% of the vote, followed by Anna Markova, a former member of Yakovlev's staff, with 15.89%. 10.97 percent of the electorate voted against all nine nominees. Turnout was low at just 29%. On 5 October 2003, Matviyenko won the second round with 63 percent (vs. 24% for Anna Markova) and was elected governor of Saint Petersburg, the head of the Saint Petersburg City Administration. She became the first female head of government of Saint Petersburg.

Confirmation in office

In 2005, a new Russian federal law came into force whereby governors are proposed by the President of Russia and approved or disapproved by regional legislative assemblies rather than elected by direct popular vote. On 6 December 2006, one year before her term as elected governor would expire, Valentina Matviyenko asked Vladimir Putin to nominate her for approval according to the new legislation, and he agreed. She was approved by the Saint Petersburg Legislative Assembly on 22 December 2006.

Public protests
On 3 March 2007, scores of participants of the Dissenters' March, organized by marginal opposition parties, demonstrated in the city's main avenue, Nevsky Prospekt, calling for governor Matviyenko's dismissal. She in turn accused them of stirring up trouble ahead of elections to the Saint Petersburg Legislative Assembly scheduled for 11 March, of criticising the city's perceived dynamic development and for allegedly receiving financial support from dubious sources. On 15 April 2007, the Dissenters' March took place in Saint Petersburg for the second time.

Assassination attempt
On 19 May 2007, the Federal Security Service of the Russian Federation announced it had detained several members of an undisclosed youth religious group on 16 May who were alleged to be preparing an assassination attempt on Valentina Matviyenko's life using hand grenades and plastic explosive. On 23 May, FSB Director Nikolay Patrushev announced that the prevented attempt had been scheduled for June.

City development

Budget and incomes

Matviyenko electoral promises included the transfer of a significant share of taxation money from the federal budget to the local one, which was supported by President Putin, a native of Saint Petersburg. Along with the booming economy and improving investment climate this allowed to significantly improve the standard of living in the city, making income levels much closer to Moscow and high above most other Russian federal subjects.

Political profile
New governor pledged her support for the idea of transferring some part of the capital's functions from Moscow to Saint Petersburg. The role of Saint Petersburg in Russian politics has risen, marked by the transfer of the Constitutional Court of Russia from Moscow in 2008. The city's main television broadcast, Petersburg – Channel 5, in October 2006 was licensed to broadcast nationwide again.

The 32nd summit of G8 countries were held in Saint Petersburg from 15 to 17 July 2006. St. Petersburg International Economic Forum continued to grow in popularity and attendance in the late 2000s.

Infrastructure

Matviyenko developed a large number of megaprojects in housing and infrastructure, such as building of the Saint Petersburg Ring Road including the Big Obukhovsky Bridge (the only non-draw bridge over the Neva River in the city), completion of the Saint Petersburg Dam aimed to put an end to ill-famous Saint Petersburg floods, launching Line 5 of Saint Petersburg Metro and starting land reclamation in the Neva Bay for the new Marine Facade of the city (the largest European waterfront development project) containing the Passenger Port of St. Petersburg.

Industry
Several major auto-producing companies were drawn to Saint Petersburg or its vicinity, including Toyota, General Motors, Nissan, Hyundai Motor, Suzuki, Magna International, Scania and MAN SE (all having plants in Shushary industrial zone), thus turning the city into an important center of automotive industry in Russia, specializing on foreign brands.

Tourism

The city administration launched a number of programs aimed to increase the number of tourist arrivals (such as advertisement campaigns abroad) and to improve the tourist infrastructure in the city, including the construction of new hotels. Between 2003 and 2010, the number of tourists in Saint Petersburg doubled and reached 5.2 million, which placed the city among the top 5 tourist centers in Europe.

Culture
The June celebration of the graduation from school, the Scarlet Sails (a part of the White Nights Festival), rose to a new scale under Matviyenko and began to be broadcast nationwide on Petersburg – Channel 5. The Saint Petersburg Carnivals on the day of the city, 27 May, also became much grander.

Criticism

Controversial construction projects

The new construction in already heavily built-up areas was a point of continuous criticism during Matviyenko's governorship. Of especial note were a number of building projects deemed by many experts and conservative public to contradict the classical architecture of the city where the entire centre is UNESCO World Heritage Site.

Matviyenko supported the construction project of the Gazprom City business center (also called Okhta Center) including a 400-meter skyscraper holding the headquarters of some of Gazprom's subsidiaries on the right bank of the Neva River in the vicinity of the historic Smolny Cathedral. The current regulations forbidding construction buildings of more than 42 meters (48 with expert approval) were specially changed by the city administration for the project.

By the end of her governor service, Matviyenko more eagerly engaged in dialogue with the groups of the so-called gradozaschitniki (градозащитники, "city-defenders"). A number of controversial projects eventually were cancelled or modified. Notably, after an extensive public protest campaign, which lasted several years, and after the personal involvement of Russian President Dmitry Medvedev, the Okhta Center was relocated from Okhta to Lakhta suburb.

Other controversial projects include the Mariinsky Theatre Second Stage and the reconstruction of the New Holland Island. Both projects required destruction of some of the earlier historic buildings, and the new stage of the Mariinsky Theatre was originally attempted to be built according to a highly original design by French architect Dominique Perrault, resembling a cocoon. The project, however, was deemed too costly and too much out-of-line with the surrounding classical architecture, and the design was changed.

Snow cleaning problems
Matviyenko's handling of the cleaning of the city from snow during the unusually cold and snowy winters of 2009–2010 and 2010–2011, in the last two years of her governorship, drew criticism, especially from the automobile owners and drivers in the city. The authorities were unprepared for vast amounts of snow on the city streets, especially in the historical centre, and there was a lack of snow cleaning equipment.

Accusations of corporate raiding

Businessman Vitaly Arkhangelsky accused Matviyenko of corporate raiding and corruption. According to him, Matvieyenko is the real owner of the Bank Saint Petersburg that staged a corporate raid on the property of his company, OMG that included Vyborg Port and Western Terminal of Saint Petersburg port using falsified documents with Arkhangelsy's forged signature. The lawyers of Bank Saint Petersburg insist on exclusion materials of Matviyenko's involvement from the criminal case in London court.

Chairwoman of the Federation Council

On 22 August 2011, soon after completion of the Saint Petersburg Dam along with the Saint Petersburg Ring Road, Matviyenko resigned from the office of the governor of Saint Petersburg. Georgy Poltavchenko was appointed as acting governor in her place. She was backed by President Dmitry Medvedev as a candidate to head the Federal Assembly or Upper House of the Russian Federation. The previous speaker of the Federation Council, Sergey Mironov, was recalled in May after criticising Matviyenko's handling of Saint Petersburg. The leader of A Just Russia party, Mironov was ousted by the majority United Russia and replaced by an acting speaker Alexander Torshin.

As a member of United Russia party, Matviyenko stood in a municipal election in August in order to have legal possibilities to attain the office in the Federation Council. She won the municipal election with more than 95% of the vote, despite having 18% approval rating in July, for which she was criticized by the opposition.

On 21 September 2011, she was elected the Chairwoman of the Federation Council of the Russian Federation by 140 votes with one abstention and none cast against.

Sanctions
Due to her role in the Crimean status referendum, Matviyenko became one of the first people put under executive sanctions by United States President Barack Obama. The sanctions freeze her assets in the US and ban her from entering the United States.  She was put on a sanction list by the United States and Canada on 17 March 2014, the European Union on 21 March 2014, Switzerland on 2 April 2014, Liechtenstein on 17 April 2014, Australia on 19 June 2014, and Ukraine on 16 October 2016.

Family
Valentina Matviyenko has a son, Sergey (ru, born 5 May 1973), with her husband, Vladimir Vasilyevich Matviyenko. In May 2003, Sergey Matviyenko was appointed vice-president of the Bank Saint Petersburg. Later he also became vice-president and first vice-president (2005) of Vneshtorgbank. Sergey married Zara Mgoyan, a Russian pop singer of Armenian and Kurdish origin (b. 1983) on 30 April 2004, but they divorced a year later.

Honours and awards

Russia and the USSR
 Order of Merit for the Fatherland;
2nd class (19 March 2009) – for services to the state and personal contribution to the socio-economic development of the city
3rd class (7 April 1999) – for services to the state and many years of diligent work
4th class (2003)
 Order of Honour (1996) – for services to the state, a large contribution to the foreign policy and ensuring Russia's national interests, courage and dedication shown by the line of duty
 Order of the Red Banner of Labour (1981)
 Order of the Badge of Honour (1976)
 Medal "In Commemoration of the 300th Anniversary of Saint Petersburg"
President of the Russian Federation
 Diploma of the President of the Russian Federation (27 January 2010) – for active participation in the preparation and conduct of meetings of the State Council
 Gratitude of the President of the Russian Federation (14 August 1995) – for active participation in the preparation and conduct of the 50th anniversary of Victory in Great Patriotic War of 1941–1945
 Gratitude of the President of the Russian Federation (2 September 2008) – for active participation in preparing and conducting the St. Petersburg International Economic Forum and the meeting of heads of states – members of the Commonwealth of Independent States

Departmental awards
 Medal "For cooperation with the FSB of Russia" (Federal Security Service, 2004)
 Medal "For military cooperation" (Ministry of Internal Affairs, 2003)
 Medal "For Strengthening Military Cooperation" (Ministry of Defence, 1999)
 Medal "Admiral Kuznetsov" (Russian Ministry of Defence, 2005)
 Medal "For Services to the national health care" (Ministry of Health and Social Development, 2003)
 Medal "100 Years of St. Petersburg University, GPA MES of Russia" (Ministry of Emergency Situations, 2006)
 Medal "For Strengthening customs community" (Federal Customs Service, 2008)
 Medal "For cooperation" (Russian Prosecutor's Office, 2010)
 Badge "For personal contribution to the protection and improvement of Civil Defence"(2004)
 "Excellent border troops" (Border Guard Service of Russia, 2003)
 Medal "For merits in the field of civil aviation" (Interstate Aviation Committee, 2004)
 Medal "For merits in national security" (Security Council of Russia, 2009)

Awards of the Russian Federation
 Badge of Honour "For services to St. Petersburg" (31 August 2011)

Foreign awards
 Decoration of Honour for Services to the Republic of Austria (2001)
 Grand Cross of the Order of Honour (Greece, 2007)
 Order "For the great love of independent Turkmenistan" (Turkmenistan, September 2009) – for his great contribution to strengthening the Turkmen-Russian relations
 Medal "For outstanding contributions to the National Year of China and Russia" (China, 2008)
 Order of Friendship of Peoples (Belarus) (2009)
 Knights Cross of the Order of the Lion of Finland (1 December 2009)

Religious awards
 Order of St. Sergius;
1st class (Russian Orthodox Church, 2010) – in consideration of assistance to the Russian Orthodox Church
2nd class
 Order of St Princess Olga, 1st class (Russian Orthodox Church, 2006) and 2nd class (2001)
 Order Martyr Tryphon, 2nd class (Russian Orthodox Church, 2001) – for his great personal contribution to the fight against drug addiction, alcoholism and other harmful phenomena

Honorary degrees and titles
 Honorary Member of the Russian Academy of Arts

Prizes
 Prize of the Russian Federation in Science and Technology (2010)

Other Awards
 Pushkin Medal (MAPRYAL, 2003) – "For outstanding services in the Russian language"

See also
Saint Petersburg City Administration

References

External links
 
 President of the Council of the Federation
 Short biography in English

1949 births
Living people
People from Shepetivka
Mayors of places in Russia
Governors of Saint Petersburg
Russian nationalists
Communist Party of the Soviet Union members
Russian women diplomats
Women mayors of places in Russia
Women heads of federal subjects of Russia
21st-century Russian women politicians
Ukrainian emigrants to Russia
Full Cavaliers of the Order "For Merit to the Fatherland"
Recipients of the Order of Honour (Russia)
Recipients of the Decoration for Services to the Republic of Austria
Grand Crosses of the Order of Honour (Greece)
Commanders Grand Cross of the Order of the Lion of Finland
Honorary Members of the Russian Academy of Arts
Diplomatic Academy of the Ministry of Foreign Affairs of the Russian Federation alumni
Ambassador Extraordinary and Plenipotentiary (Russian Federation)
Ambassadors of Russia to Greece
Ambassadors of Russia to Malta
Members of the Federation Council of Russia (after 2000)
Chairmen of the Federation Council (Russia)
People of the annexation of Crimea by the Russian Federation
21st-century Russian politicians
20th-century Russian politicians
Women ambassadors
Russian individuals subject to European Union sanctions
Anti-Ukrainian sentiment in Russia
Women legislative speakers
Russian individuals subject to the U.S. Department of the Treasury sanctions